Tal Slutzker (born March 8, 1986) is an Israeli painter and poet.

Biography 
Tal Slutzker was born in Ra'anana to Nachum and Pola, both teachers. During childhood he painted and played the violin. At the third grade he played a solo with orchestra tour in Holand. At the same time he studied drawing and painting of the Russian academic tradition with painter Zakhar Sherman. At age 14 he left high school to study at the Jerusalem Studio School where he was the youngest student at the program.

Awards 
2004-2006	America-Israel Foundation Award (Keren Sharet)

Solo exhibitions 
2000	Yad Lebanim Gallery, Ra’anana (catalogue)
2001	Yad Lebanim Gallery, Rishon Le’zion
2006	Window Installation at Tova Osman Gallery, Tel Aviv 
2011	“Where Is My Mind”, Bernard Gallery, Tel Aviv 
2015                                “Them”, Bernard Gallery, Tel Aviv 
2017 Now, Herzelia Museum.

Group exhibitions 
 2004	Artspace Gallery, Jerusalem
 2005 “Artik 7”, The America-Israel Foundation Awards, The Museum of Israeli Art, Ramat Gan
 2005 “Reality”, Meyuhas Art Gallery, Tel Aviv
 2006 “Artik 8”, The America-Israel Foundation Awards, University Gallery, Tel Aviv University
 2006 “No Names”, University Gallery, Haifa University
 2010 “30 Years to the Tova Osman Gallery”, The Artists House, Tel Aviv
 2010 “I Was A Child”, Jaffa Port, Tel Aviv
 2013 Hanina Contemporary Art
 2013 Egozi Gallery
 2014 Blue-And-White Delft, Tel Aviv Museum of Art
 2015 Hacubia gallery, Jerusaelm.

References

External links
 Official site. 
 "The shadows artist, Movie about Tal slutzker. 
 Them project, in Art market magazine.
  Interview about the "Now" exhibition Iltv 25.10.2017

1986 births
Living people
Israeli painters
Israeli poets